RE: Alistair is a free English otome game developed and published by sakevisual for the Windows, macOS and Linux. It was released on February 28, 2010.

Gameplay
The player takes the role  of the protagonist, Merui Lucas. The game is primarily told in visual novel format, where the player's decisions affect the relationships she has with potential love interests in the game. It is possible to see five different endings, depending on the choices.

Plot
Merui is a girl who loves video games. She often plays an MMORPG called Rivenwell Online with her online friend Fiona. When a boy with the user name Alistair steals a rare item from her in the game and forces her into a bet to get it back, she is determined to exact revenge on him. Unfortunately, she has no idea who he is in real life. She finds out that only one of three boys from her school could be Alistair; Travis, Shiro, Derek. The player can now influence the story and begin a romance with one of the three.

Characters
 Merui Lucas is the protagonist. She is a 16-year-old girl who loves video games.
 Travis Wright is the president of the computer club at Merui's school.
 Shiro Takayama is a shy classmate of Merui.
 Derek Nevine is a basketball player and a boy with high self-esteem.

RE: Alistair++ & Backstage Pass
An updated version of the game was released on April 10, 2010. The update included more CGs, more scenes, an updated GUI, and a bonus scene that unlocked after all the endings were achieved.

On January 1, 2013, a new otome game titled Backstage Pass was announced. The game is set in the same universe as RE: Alistair and promised features that people missed in RE: Alistair. The game is part of sakevisual's Green Tea Line and therefore commercial. Backstage Pass is completely voiced and, after a few delays, was released in August 2016. Several voice actors have a role in the game including Casey Mongillo, Joel McDonald, Lucien Dodge, Micah Solusod, and Ian Sinclair. The character of Merui Lucas makes a cameo appearance in the game and is voiced by Apphia Yu.

Merchandise
On September 10, 2010, sakevisual released an art book that included the game's artwork, extra scenes, fan art, and a short story. They have also sold plushies of the main cast and a replica of Derek's T-shirt. They've also given away free stickers of the main cast at various conventions for promotion.

Reception
The game received positive reception.

It received a score of 88/100 on Gamertell, Jenni Lada wrote about the game: "I’m honestly surprised RE: Alistair is a free game. It’s very well made [...] The story is well written, with believable characters, the artwork is pretty and very easy to look at [...]

Indie Review gave 3.5 of 5 stars and wrote about the game: "Nonetheless, this game's strengths outweigh its shortcomings, and is definitely worth a look if you are a fan of visual novels."

Gamezebo gave 4.5 of 5 stars, Mike Rose described "RE: Alistair++ as an incredible addition to the visual novel genre, indulging the player in some top quality storytelling and pleasing art."

References

External links
 Official website of RE: Alistair
 

2010 video games
Otome games
MacOS games
Windows games
Linux games
Video games developed in the United States
Visual novels
Ren'Py games
Video games with alternate endings